Guildhall Museum can refer any of the Guild halls in England now used as museums, including

Boston Guildhall
Carlisle Guildhall
Leicester Guildhall
London Guildhall (museum from 1826 to 1974)
Rochester Guildhall